Aethes spirana is a species of moth of the family Tortricidae. It was described by Kennel in 1899. It is found in Turkey and Iran.

References

spirana
Moths described in 1899
Moths of Asia
Taxa named by Julius von Kennel